This is a list of electoral results for the electoral district of Wonthaggi in Victorian state elections.

Members for Wonthaggi

Election results

Elections in the 1950s

Elections in the 1940s

Elections in the 1930s

 Two party preferred vote was estimated.

 Two party preferred vote was estimated.

Elections in the 1920s

 Preferences were not distributed.

References

Victoria (Australia) state electoral results by district